The 2006 season of the astronomy TV show Jack Horkheimer: Star Gazer starring Jack Horkheimer started on January 2, 2006. The show's episode numbering scheme changed several times during its run to coincide with major events in the show's history. The official Star Gazer website hosts the complete scripts for each of the shows.


2006 season

References

External links 
  Star Gazer official website
 

Lists of Jack Horkheimer: Star Gazer episodes
2006 American television seasons